Teruto Ishihara (born July 23, 1991) is a Japanese professional mixed martial artist who previously competed in the Featherweight division of the Ultimate Fighting Championship. A professional competitor since 2011, he has formerly competed for Shooto.

Mixed martial arts career

Early career
Ishihara began his professional MMA career in 2011, debuting in the Shooto promotion. Over the next four-and-a-half years he amassed a record of 7–2–1.

Road to UFC: Japan
In June 2015, Ishihara was announced as one of the eight featherweights competing on Road to UFC: Japan, a show in the style of The Ultimate Fighter. Ishihara faced Tatsuya Ando in the quarterfinals and won by majority decision. He then faced Akiyo Nishiura in the semifinals and again won by decision.

Ishihara ultimately faced Mizuto Hirota in the finals at UFC Fight Night 75 on September 27, 2015.  The bout was ruled a split draw with no winner decided.  The UFC announced post-fight that Hirota and Ishihara would both be awarded contracts.

Ultimate Fighting Championship
In his second fight for the promotion, Ishihara faced Julian Erosa on March 5, 2016 at UFC 196.  Ishihara won the fight via KO early in the second round.

Ishihara next faced Horacio Gutiérrez on August 6, 2016 at UFC Fight Night 92. Ishihara won the fight via first-round KO and subsequently received a Performance of the Night bonus.

Ishihara faced Artem Lobov on November 19, 2016 at UFC Fight Night 99. He lost the fight via unanimous decision.

Ishihara faced Gray Maynard on July 7, 2017 at The Ultimate Fighter 25 Finale. He lost the fight by unanimous decision.

Ishihara faced Rolando Dy on September 23, 2017 at UFC Fight Night: Saint Preux vs. Okami. He knocked down Dy 20 second in round one but Dy managed to survive. Throughout the fight Dy kicked three times to Ishihara's groin area and was deducted a point by the referee. After three rounds fight, the judges awarded the win to Ishihara via unanimous decision (28–27, 28–27, and 29–27) ended Ishihara 2 fight losing streak.

Ishihara faced José Alberto Quiñónez in a bantamweight bout on February 10, 2018 at UFC 221.  He lost the fight via unanimous decision.

Ishihara faced promotional newcomer Petr Yan on June 23, 2018 at UFC Fight Night 132. He lost the fight via knockout in the first round.

Ishihara faced Kang Kyung-ho on February 10, 2019 at UFC 234. He lost the fight via a submission in round one and was subsequently released from the promotion.

Post-UFC career
After the release, Ishihara returned to Shooto and made his comeback against Kazuma Sone at Shooto 0131 on January 31, 2021. He lost the fight via unanimous decision.

Ishihara then faced Levi Mowles at Fury FC 48 on July 25, 2021. He lost the fight via first-round submission.

Ishihara faced Vinicius Zani at Fury FC 52 on October 17, 2021. The bout was declared a draw.

Ishihara faced Jose Hernandez at the inaugural Urijah Faber's A1 Combat event, held on May 1, 2022. He won the fight by a second-round technical knockout.

Ishihara faced Westin Wilson at XMMA 5 on July 23, 2022. He won the fight by a first-round knockout, flooring Wilson with a left straight.

Ishihara faced Francisco Rivera on August 20, 2022 at UNF 2. He lost the bout via unanimous decision.

Championships and accomplishments

Mixed martial arts
Ultimate Fighting Championship
Road to UFC: Japan Featherweight Tournament Co-Winner (Drew with Mizuto Hirota) 
Performance of the Night (One time) vs. Horacio Gutiérrez

Mixed martial arts record

|-
|
|align=center|
|Willie Gates
|
|Urijah Faber's A1 Combat 9
|
|align=center|
|align=center|
|Long Beach, California, United States
|
|-
|Loss
|align=center|
|Francisco Rivera
|Decision (unanimous)
|UNF 2
|
|align=center|3
|align=center|5:00
|Commerce, California, United States
|
|-
|Win
|align=center|
|Westin Wilson
|KO (punch)
|XMMA 5
|
|align=center|1
|align=center|3:25
|Columbia, South Carolina, United States
|
|-
|Win
|align=center|
|Jose Hernandez
|TKO (punches)
|Urijah Faber's A1 Combat 1
|
|align=center|2
|align=center|2:53
|Wheatland, California, United States
|
|-
|Draw
|align=center|
|Vinicius Zani
|Draw (majority)
|Fury FC 52
|
|align=center|3
|align=center|5:00
|Houston, Texas, United States
|
|-
|Loss
|align=center|
|Levi Mowles
|Submission (rear-naked choke)
|Fury FC 48
|
|align=center|1
|align=center|2:44
|Houston, Texas, United States
|
|-
|Loss
|align=center|
|Kazuma Sone
|Decision (unanimous)
|Shooto 0131
|
|align=center|3
|align=center|5:00
|Tokyo, Japan
|
|-
|Loss
|align=center|10–7–2
|Kyung Ho Kang
|Technical Submission (rear-naked choke)
|UFC 234
|
|align=center|1
|align=center|3:59
|Melbourne, Australia 
|
|-
|Loss
|align=center|10–6–2
|Petr Yan
|KO (punches)
|UFC Fight Night: Cowboy vs. Edwards
|
|align=center|1
|align=center|3:28
|Kallang, Singapore
|
|-
|Loss
|align=center|10–5–2
|José Alberto Quiñónez
|Decision (unanimous)
|UFC 221 
|
|align=center|3
|align=center|5:00
|Perth, Australia
|
|-
|Win
|align=center|10–4–2
|Rolando Dy
|Decision (unanimous)
|UFC Fight Night: Saint Preux vs. Okami 
|
|align=center|3
|align=center|5:00
|Saitama, Japan
|
|-
|Loss
|align=center|9–4–2
|Gray Maynard
|Decision (unanimous)
|The Ultimate Fighter: Redemption Finale
|
|align=center|3
|align=center|5:00
|Las Vegas, Nevada, United States
|
|-
|Loss
|align=center|9–3–2
|Artem Lobov
|Decision (unanimous) 
|UFC Fight Night: Mousasi vs. Hall 2
|
|align=center|3
|align=center|5:00
|Belfast, Northern Ireland
|   
|-
|Win
|align=center|9–2–2
|Horacio Gutiérrez 
|KO (punches)
|UFC Fight Night: Rodríguez vs. Caceres 
|
|align=center|1
|align=center|2:32
|Salt Lake City, Utah, United States
|
|-
|Win
|align=center|8–2–2
|Julian Erosa
|KO (punches)
|UFC 196
|
|align=center|2
|align=center|0:34
|Las Vegas, Nevada, United States
|
|-
| Draw
| align=center| 7–2–2
| Mizuto Hirota
| Draw (split)
| UFC Fight Night: Barnett vs. Nelson
| 
| align=center| 3
| align=center| 5:00
| Saitama, Japan
||
|-
| Win
| align=center| 7–2–1
| Jung Hwan Jo
| TKO (punches)
| Vale Tudo Japan: VTJ 5th in Osaka
| 
| align=center| 2
| align=center| 3:24
| Osaka, Japan
| 
|-
| Loss
| align=center| 6–2–1
| Ulka Sasaki
| Technical Submission (rear-naked choke)
| Vale Tudo Japan: VTJ 4th
| 
| align=center| 2
| align=center| 1:46
| Tokyo, Japan
|
|-
| Win
| align=center| 6–1–1
| Koji Mori
| TKO (punch)
| Vale Tudo Japan: VTJ 2nd
| 
| align=center| 1
| align=center| 2:12
| Tokyo, Japan
|
|-
| Draw
| align=center| 5–1–1
| Kazuhiro Ito
| Technical Draw (fighters fell from the ring)
| Shooto: Border: Season 4: Second
| 
| align=center| 1
| align=center| 4:48
| Osaka, Japan
|
|-
| Win
| align=center| 5–1
| Yasuaki Nagamoto
| KO (punches)
| Shooto: Gig West 14
| 
| align=center| 1
| align=center| 0:19
| Osaka, Japan
|
|-
| Win
| align=center| 4–1
| Jong Hoon Choi
| KO (punches)
| Shooto: Border: Season 4: First
| 
| align=center| 1
| align=center| 1:03
| Osaka, Japan
| 
|-
| Loss
| align=center| 3–1
| Michinori Tanaka
| Decision (unanimous)
| Shooto: The Rookie Tournament 2011 Final
| 
| align=center| 2
| align=center| 5:00
| Tokyo, Japan
| 
|-
| Win
| align=center| 3–0
| Kenji Yamamoto
| KO (punch)
| Shooto: Border: Season 3: Roaring Thunder
| 
| align=center| 1
| align=center| 0:16
| Osaka, Japan
| 
|-
| Win
| align=center| 2–0
| Naritoshi Kakuta
| KO (punch)
| Shooto: Gig West 13
| 
| align=center| 1
| align=center| 4:56
| Osaka, Japan
| 
|-
| Win
| align=center| 1–0
| Takuya Kodama
| Decision (unanimous)
| Shooto: Border: Season 3: Spring Thunder
| 
| align=center| 2
| align=center| 5:00
| Osaka, Japan
| 

|-  
|-  bgcolor="#fbb"
| 2014-11-30 || Loss|| align=left| Kaito || SHOOT BOXING S-cup 65 kg World Tournament 2018 || Tokyo, Japan || Decision || 4 || 3:00
|-
| colspan=9 | Legend:

See also
List of male mixed martial artists

References

External links
 
 

1991 births
Living people
People from the Amami Islands
Japanese male mixed martial artists
Bantamweight mixed martial artists
Featherweight mixed martial artists
Mixed martial artists utilizing shootfighting
Mixed martial artists utilizing kickboxing
Sportspeople from Kagoshima Prefecture
Ultimate Fighting Championship male fighters